Albania participated in the Eurovision Song Contest 2022 in Turin, Italy, with the song "Sekret" performed by Ronela Hajati. Albania was drawn to compete in the first semi-final of the Eurovision Song Contest, which took place on 10 May 2022. The nation failed to qualify for the final, placing 12th and scoring 58 points, marking their eighth non-qualification.

Background 

Albania accomplished its second-highest placing when first participating in 2004, with the song "The Image of You" performed by Anjeza Shahini, finishing in seventh place.

The Albanian national broadcaster  (RTSH) broadcasts the Eurovision Song Contest within Albania and organises  as the national selection format for the contest. Following the nation's debut in 2004, RTSH has consistently selected the Albanian performers and songs through the latter event, which features a competition among artists and songs. The broadcaster confirmed Albania's intention to participate in the 2022 contest on 5 July 2021, with the European Broadcasting Union (EBU) reaffirming the nation's participation on 20 October.

Before Eurovision

Festivali i Këngës 

The competition consisted of two semi-finals on 27 and 28 December, respectively, and the final on 29 December 2021. The three live shows were hosted by Albanian presenters Ardit Gjebrea, Isli Islami, Kelvi Kadilli, Xhemi Shehu and singer Jonida Maliqi.

Eurovision night 

The third and final night of  took place on 29 December 2021 at 21:00 (CET). The winner of the competition was determined by the combination of the votes by a seven-member jury panel, consisting of Anxhela Peristeri, Agim Doçi, Anxhela Faber, Osman Mula, Rozana Radi, Olsa Toqi and Olti Curri. Ronela Hajati with the song "" emerged as the winner and was simultaneously announced as Albania's representative for the Eurovision Song Contest 2022.

Key:
 Winner
 Second place
 Third place

Promotion 

A music video for "" premiered on the official YouTube channel of the Eurovision Song Contest on 4 March 2022. Prior to the scheduled contest, Hajati made several appearances across Europe between March and April 2022 to specifically promote "", including at the Eurovision-related events in Barcelona, Tel Aviv, Amsterdam and Madrid. She further performed the song live during Romania's national final for the Eurovision Song Contest, on 5 March.

At Eurovision 

Prior to the semi-final allocation draw, the EBU split the competing countries into six different pots based on voting patterns from previous contests, with the aim of reducing the chance of neighbourly voting between countries while also increasing suspense during the voting process.

Therein, it was announced that Albania was scheduled to perform in the first half of the first semi-final of the contest. Once all the competing entries for the 2022 contest had been released, the running order for the semi-finals was decided by the producers of the contest rather than through another draw, to prevent similar songs from being placed next to each other. Hajati took part in technical rehearsals on 30 April and 4 May, followed by dress rehearsals on 9 and 10 May 2022. This included the jury show on 9 May where the professional juries of each country watched and voted on the competing entries. Albania performed in the first semi-final in position one, however, the nation failed to qualify for the contest's final, standing as its eighth non-qualification.

Controversy 

In the aftermath of the first rehearsal, a controversy emerged when footage of Hajati's rehearsal, showing the singer and her accompanying dancers moving with their hands toward their intimate area, disappeared from the Instagram account of the contest. Despite no official statement by the EBU, the contest's social media team replaced and re-uploaded the photo gallery. It was speculated whether the EBU had perceived the performance as too provocative or had required the Albanian delegation to change it prior to the second rehearsal. Subsequently, the Albanian delegation's head of press Ardit Çuni revealed that Hajati would proceed with the same performance.

Voting 

Voting during the three shows of the Eurovision Song Contest involved each nation awarding two sets of points from 1-8, 10 and 12: one from their professional jury and the other from televoting. The tables below visualise a breakdown of points awarded to Albania in the first semi-final of the 2022 contest, as well as by the nation on the latter occasion and in the final. The detailed results of the Albanian jury vote, consisting of a combination between the individual rankings of Aulon Naçi, Ermira Alliu, Kamela Islamaj, Marsela Çibukaj and Roberto Radoja, and televoting are also listed. For the voting portion of the final, Andri Xhahu served as the Albanian spokesperson announcing the country's jury voting results.

Points awarded to Albania

Points awarded by Albania

Detailed voting results

References 

2022
Countries in the Eurovision Song Contest 2022
Eurovision
Eurovision